The Los Angeles Times Grand Prix was a sports car race held at the Riverside International Raceway.  The race was held throughout the track's existence, from 1957 until 1987.  The race was sponsored by the Los Angeles Times to raise money for its charities. The Special Events director was Glenn Davis, the winner of the 1946 Heisman Trophy. During the early 1970s, the event was the season ending race for the Can-Am series.

Results

 The 1981 event was also a part of the World Sportscar Championship.

References

External links
Ultimate Racing History: Riverside archive
Racing Sports Cars: Riverside archive
World Sports Racing Prototypes Can-Am archive and IMSA archive

 
Can-Am races
IMSA GT Championship races
World Sportscar Championship races
Auto races in the United States
Sports competitions in Los Angeles
Motorsport competitions in California
Recurring sporting events established in 1957